The Museum for Islamic Art (formerly known as the L.A. Mayer Institute for Islamic Art) (Hebrew: מוזיאון ל. א. מאיר לאמנות האסלאם; Arabic: معهد ل. أ. مئير للفن الإسلامي) is a museum in Jerusalem, established in 1974. Located on the corner of HaPalmach Street in Katamon, down the road from the Jerusalem Theater, it houses Islamic pottery, textiles, jewelry, ceremonial objects and other Islamic cultural artifacts.

History
The museum was founded by Vera Bryce Salomons, daughter of Sir David Lionel Salomons, in memory of her professor, Leo Aryeh Mayer, rector of the Hebrew University of Jerusalem, a scholar of Islamic art who died in 1969. Salomons specified that the museum would remain financially independent, unsupported by public funding. The building was designed by Alexander Friedman and construction began in 1965. The first director was Gabriel Moriah.

The museum has nine galleries organized in chronological order, exploring the beliefs and art of Islamic civilization. In addition to Mayer's private collection, the museum houses antique chess pieces, dominoes and playing cards; daggers, swords, helmets; textiles; jewelry; glassware, pottery and metalware produced in Islamic countries, from Spain to India. A collection of Islamic carpets was added in 1999.

Nadim Sheiban was appointed director of the museum in 2014. His first move was to transform the weapons hall in the entrance into a space for temporary exhibitions.

Rare clock collection
A gallery in the museum also displays the David Salomons clock and watch collection. Salomons was the nephew of the first Jewish Lord Mayor of London.

On 15 April 1983, some 200 items, including paintings and dozens of rare clocks and watches, were stolen when the museum was burgled. Among the stolen timepieces was the watch known as the "Marie Antoinette", the so-called "Mona Lisa" of watches, and the crown jewel of the watch collection, made by the famed French-Swiss watchmaker Abraham-Louis Breguet reputedly for Queen Marie Antoinette, and estimated to be worth US$30 million. It was part of a unique collection of 57 Breguet timepieces donated to the museum by the daughter of Sir David Lionel Salomons, one of the leading experts on Breguet.

The case remained unsolved for more than 20 years. In August 2006, a Tel Aviv antiques appraiser contacted the museum and reported that some of the stolen items were being held by a Tel Aviv lawyer whose client had inherited them from her deceased husband, and who wished to sell them back to the museum. The original asking price was US$2 million (the value of the reward offered in the case) but this was negotiated down to US$35,000. Among the returned items was the "Marie Antoinette" and a valuable "Sympathique" clock, also by Breguet. A later search of a warehouse in Israel produced documents that led to safety deposit boxes owned by Na'aman Diller in Israel, Germany, the Netherlands and the United States. Police identified the client as Nili Shamrat, an expatriate Israeli who had married Diller in 2003. She told police that, just before her husband's death in 2004, he confessed and advised her to sell the collection. Shamrat was arrested in May 2008, after a house search by Israeli and American investigators found several of the stolen clocks, some rare 18th-century paintings, and catalog cards bearing the name of the clocks and their manufacturers.

On November 18, 2008, French and Israeli police officials discovered 43 more stolen timepieces in two bank safes in France. Of the 106 rare timepieces stolen in 1983, 96 were recovered.

On April 3, 2010, Shamrat was sentenced to 300 hours of community service and given a five-year suspended sentence for possession of stolen property.

Contemporary Arab art
In 2008, a group exhibit of contemporary Arab art opened at the Museum, the first show of local Arab art in an Israeli museum and the first to be mounted by an Arab curator. Thirteen Arab artists participated in the show.

See also
Islamic Museum, Jerusalem
List of Israeli museums

References

External links

 

1974 establishments in Israel
Art museums and galleries in Israel
Art museums established in 1974
Decorative arts museums
Islamic museums
Islam in Jerusalem
Museums in Jerusalem
Katamon